Fusarium subglutinans is a fungal plant pathogen.

Taxonomy
Fusarium subglutinans is the anamorph of Gibberella fujikuroi. 
Fusarium strains in the Gibberella fujikuroi species complex cause diseases in a number of economically important plants.  DNA sequencing data reveals the presence of two major groups representing cryptic species in F. subglutinans. These were further divided into groups that appeared to be reproductively isolated in the environment which suggests that they are undergoing separation into distinct taxa. One such divergent group is Fusarium subglutinans f. sp. pini which causes pitch canker of pine trees. It is a synonym of Fusarium circinatum.

Other members of the complex and their host plants are:
Fusarium moniliforme - Maize
Fusarium oxysporum - Pine
Fusarium proliferatum - Rice
Fusarium subglutinans - Maize, Mango
Fusarium subglutinans f. sp. ananas - Pineapple

References

subglutinans
Fungal plant pathogens and diseases
Maize diseases
Mango tree diseases
Fungi described in 1925